Benjamin Silver (March 26, 1810 – April 25, 1894) was an American politician and farmer from Maryland. He served in the Maryland House of Delegates in 1868.

Early life
Benjamin Silver was born on March 26, 1810, in Harford County, Maryland, to Charity (née Warnock) and Benjamin Silver. He attended common schools and attended a classical school near Rock Run taught by Thompson Hudson. Silver attended Yale College in the class of 1833 for preparatory studies of medicine, but did not complete his studies.

Career
In November 1832, Silver entered his brother Philip W.'s merchantile business in Darlington. After fourteen years, he left the business. Silver started farming at his farm near Glenville around 1848. Silver was a Democrat. Silver served as a member of the Maryland House of Delegates in 1868.

Silver was an elder and trustee of Deer Creek Harmony Presbyterian Church since its organization in 1855.

Personal life
Silver married Emily M. Pannell in 1846. They had three children, Benjamin Jr., Mary W. and Mrs. Griffin T. Milton. Silver's wife predeceased him. Silver was a Presbyterian.

Silver died on April 25, 1894, at his home near Harmony, Maryland. He was buried at Deer Creek Harmony Presbyterian Church.

References

1810 births
1894 deaths
People from Harford County, Maryland
Democratic Party members of the Maryland House of Delegates
Presbyterians from Maryland